Nupserha is a genus of longhorn beetles of the subfamily Lamiinae, containing the following species:

 Nupserha acuta Holzschuh, 1986
 Nupserha alexandrovi Plavilstshikov, 1915
 Nupserha andamanica Breuning, 1960
 Nupserha annamana Breuning, 1960
 Nupserha annulata (Thomson, 1857)
 Nupserha antennalis Jordan, 1894
 Nupserha antennata Gahan, 1894
 Nupserha antinorii Aurivillius, 1926
 Nupserha apicata Fairmaire, 1891
 Nupserha assamana Breuning, 1960
 Nupserha aterrima Breuning, 1967
 Nupserha atriceps Breuning, 1948
 Nupserha aurodiscalis Breuning, 1953
 Nupserha basalis (Erichson, 1843)
 Nupserha basipilosa Holzschuh, 1986
 Nupserha bicolor (Thomson, 1857)
 Nupserha bicoloripennis Breuning, 1958
 Nupserha bidentata (Fabricius, 1792)
 Nupserha bipunctata (Aurivillius, 1914)
 Nupserha bivittata Aurivillius, 1907
 Nupserha brachytrita Aurivillius, 1914
 Nupserha brevior (Pic, 1908)
 Nupserha carinicollis (Hintz, 1919)
 Nupserha cauta Holzschuh, 1986
 Nupserha cerrutii Breuning, 1953
 Nupserha ceylonica Gardner, 1936
 Nupserha clypealis (Fairmaire, 1895)
 Nupserha conradti Kolbe, 1894
 Nupserha convergens (Aurivillius, 1914)
 Nupserha curialis Pascoe, 1866
 Nupserha deusta (Dalman, 1817)
 Nupserha elongata (Kolbe, 1893)
 Nupserha elongatissima Breuning, 1950
 Nupserha endroedyi Breuning, 1981
 Nupserha fasciata Aurivillius, 1907
 Nupserha flavipennis Breuning, 1950
 Nupserha flavipes Breuning, 1951
 Nupserha flavitarsis Breuning, 1960
 Nupserha flavoapicalis Breuning, 1950
 Nupserha flavonotum (Aurivillius, 1915)
 Nupserha fricator (Dalman, 1817)
 Nupserha fumata (Heyden, 1897)
 Nupserha fuscoapicalis Breuning, 1949
 Nupserha gahani Gestro, 1895
 Nupserha gestroi Breuning, 1950
 Nupserha grisea (Aurivillius, 1914)
 Nupserha hintzi Aurivillius, 1923
 Nupserha homeyeri Harold, 1879
 Nupserha infantula (Ganglbauer, 1889)
 Nupserha infuscata Breuning, 1960
 Nupserha insignis Aurivillius, 1911
 Nupserha kenyensis Breuning, 1958
 Nupserha laterifuga (Chevrolat, 1855)
 Nupserha laticollis Breuning, 1960  
 Nupserha lenita (Pascoe, 1867)
 Nupserha longipennis Pic, 1926
 Nupserha madurensis Pic, 1926
 Nupserha malabarensis Pic, 1939
 Nupserha malaisei Breuning, 1949
 Nupserha marginella (Bates, 1873)
 Nupserha mediofusciventris Breuning, 1962
 Nupserha melanoscelis Aurivillius, 1922
 Nupserha minor Pic, 1939
 Nupserha monticola (Hintz, 1919)
 Nupserha mozambica Breuning, 1958
 Nupserha multimaculata Pic, 1939
 Nupserha mutata Pascoe, 1867
 Nupserha nigerrima Hintz, 1919
 Nupserha nigriceps Gahan, 1894
 Nupserha nigricollis Breuning, 1960
 Nupserha nigricornis Fisher, 1935
 Nupserha nigrohumeralis Pic, 1927
 Nupserha nigrolateralis Breuning, 1955
 Nupserha nitidior Pic, 1939
 Nupserha nyassensis Aurivillius, 1914
 Nupserha ornaticollis Breuning, 1949
 Nupserha oxyura (Pascoe, 1867)
 Nupserha pallescens Aurivillius, 1913
 Nupserha pallidipennis (Redtenbacher, 1858)
 Nupserha parakenyensis Breuning, 1978
 Nupserha pararufipennis Breuning, 1978
 Nupserha perforata Breuning, 1958
 Nupserha pseudinfantula Breuning, 1948
 Nupserha pseudoflavinotum Breunng, 1950
 Nupserha punctata Jordan, 1894
 Nupserha puncticollis Breuning, 1960
 Nupserha punctigera (Pascoe, 1867)
 Nupserha quadricostata (Hintz, 1911)
 Nupserha quadrioculata (Thunberg, 1787)
 Nupserha rhodesica Breuning, 1978
 Nupserha rotundicollis Breuning, 1950
 Nupserha rotundipennis Breuning, 1950
 Nupserha rufipennis Breuning, 1949
 Nupserha rufonotaticeps Breuning, 1960
 Nupserha rufulipennis Breuning, 1963
 Nupserha schmidi Breuning, 1966   
 Nupserha sericea Breuning, 1955
 Nupserha sexpunctata (Chevrolat, 1857)
 Nupserha seychellarum Breuning, 1982
 Nupserha similis Breuning, 1978
 Nupserha somalica Breuning, 1951
 Nupserha spinifera Gressitt, 1948
 Nupserha subabbreviata (Pic, 1916)
 Nupserha sublenita Breuning, 1950
 Nupserha subternigra Breuning, 1960
 Nupserha szetschuanica Breuning, 1947
 Nupserha taliana (Pic, 1916)
 Nupserha tanganjicae Breuning, 1978 
 Nupserha tatsienlui Breuning, 1948
 Nupserha tessmanni Breuning, 1958
 Nupserha testaceipes Pic, 1926
 Nupserha thibetana Breuning, 1948
 Nupserha tricolor Aurivillius, 1920
 Nupserha ugandensis Breuning, 1978
 Nupserha univitticollis Breuning, 1958
 Nupserha ustulata (Erichson, 1834)
 Nupserha vanrooni (Aurivillius, 1916)
 Nupserha variabilis Gahan, 1894
 Nupserha variicornis (Hintz, 1919)
 Nupserha ventralis Gahan, 1894
 Nupserha vexator (Pascoe, 1858)
 Nupserha vitticollis (Kolbe, 1893)
 Nupserha yunnana Breuning, 1960
 Nupserha yunnanensis Breuning, 1960

References

 
Saperdini